Be Dear to Me is a 1957 Danish film directed by Annelise Hovmand.

Cast
 Eva Cohn as Lene
 Lily Weiding as Mor as Skuespillerinde Maria Lehmann
 Hans Kurt as Far as Direktør Mogens Vestergaard
 Jørgen Reenberg as Lærer Harting
 Yvonne Petersen as Anne
 Annelise Jacobsen as Frk. Sørensen
 Johannes Marott as Viggo
 Gerda Madsen as kolonialforretningsejer Fru. Jørgensen
 Karen Berg as Teaterdirektør
 Betty Helsengreen as Bondekone
 Evald Gunnarsen as Erik
 Grethe Paaske as Erik's mor
 Preben Lerdorff Rye as Erik's far
 Bent Christensen as Veninden Fru Jørgensen
 Mimi Heinrich as Gårmandsdatter

Awards
Won
 Bodil Award for Best Danish Film

Nominated
 7th Berlin International Film Festival: Golden Bear

The film was also chosen as Denmark's official submission to the 30th Academy Awards for Best Foreign Language Film, but did not manage to receive a nomination.

See also

 List of submissions to the 30th Academy Awards for Best Foreign Language Film
 List of Danish submissions for the Academy Award for Best Foreign Language Film

References

External links

1957 films
1950s Danish-language films
Danish black-and-white films
Films directed by Annelise Hovmand
Best Danish Film Bodil Award winners